Martha in the Mirror is a BBC Books original novel written by Justin Richards and based on the long-running science fiction television series Doctor Who. It features the Tenth Doctor and Martha Jones. It was published on 10 April 2008 alongside Snowglobe 7, and The Many Hands.

Synopsis 

Castle Extremis - whoever holds it can control the provinces either side that have been at war for centuries. Now the castle is about to play host to the signing of a peace treaty. But as the Doctor and Martha find out, not everyone wants the war to end.

Who is the strange little girl who haunts the castle? What is the secret of the book the Doctor finds, its pages made from thin, brittle glass? Who is the hooded figure that watches from the shadows? And what is the secret of the legendary Mortal Mirror?
The Doctor and Martha don't have long to find the answers-an army is on the march, and the castle will soon be under siege once more...

See also

Whoniverse

References

External links

2008 British novels
2008 science fiction novels
New Series Adventures
Tenth Doctor novels
Novels by Justin Richards